

Champions

Major League Baseball
World Series: Pittsburgh Pirates over New York Yankees (4-3); Bobby Richardson, MVP
All-Star Game (#1), July 11 at Municipal Stadium: National League, 5-3
All-Star Game (#2), July 13 at Yankee Stadium: National League, 6-0

Other champions
College World Series: Minnesota
Japan Series: Taiyō Whales over Daimai Orions (4-0)
Little League World Series: American, Levittown, Pennsylvania
Winter Leagues
1960 Caribbean Series: Elefantes de Cienfuegos
Cuban League: Elefantes de Cienfuegos
Dominican Republic League: Leones del Escogido
Mexican Pacific League: Ostioneros de Guaymas
Panamanian League: Marlboro BBC
Puerto Rican League: Criollos de Caguas
Venezuelan Western League: Rapiños de Occidente

Awards and honors
Most Valuable Player
Roger Maris, New York Yankees (AL)
Dick Groat, Pittsburgh Pirates (NL)
Cy Young Award
Vern Law, Pittsburgh Pirates
Rookie of the Year
Ron Hansen, Baltimore Orioles (AL)
Frank Howard, Los Angeles Dodgers (NL)
The Sporting News Player of the Year Award
Roger Maris, New York Yankees
The Sporting News Pitcher of the Year Award
Chuck Estrada, Baltimore Orioles (AL)
Vern Law, Pittsburgh Pirates (NL)
The Sporting News Manager of the Year Award
Danny Murtaugh, Pittsburgh Pirates
Gold Glove Award
Vic Power (1B) (AL) 
Bobby Richardson (2B) (AL) 
Brooks Robinson (3B) (AL) 
Luis Aparicio (SS) (AL) 
Jim Landis (OF) (AL) 
Roger Maris (OF) (AL) 
Minnie Minoso (OF) (AL) 
Earl Battey (C) (AL) 
Bobby Shantz (P) (AL)

MLB statistical leaders

Major league baseball final standings

American League final standings

National League final standings

Events

January–February
January 5 – The Continental League, a proposed third major league, gets an assurance of Congressional support from New York Senator Kenneth Keating.
January 11 - He was the heart and soul of Philadelphia Phillies baseball, but on this day, Richie Ashburn was traded to the Chicago Cubs. But 3 years later he returned to the Phillies as a member of its broadcasting team and he would remain with the team until his untimely death in 1997.
February 4 –  For the second straight election, the BBWAA voters fail to elect a new member to the Baseball Hall of Fame. Edd Roush gets 146 votes, but 202 are necessary for election. Sam Rice (143) and Eppa Rixey (142) are next in line.
February 15 – In Caribbean Series action, the Elefantes de Cienfuegos completes a 6-0 sweep to give the Cuban team the Series championship for the fifth straight year. Camilo Pascual, who went 2-0 with 15 strikeouts including a one-hit shutout in the clincher, is named Most Valuable Player.
February 18 – Walter O'Malley, owner of the Los Angeles Dodgers, completes the purchase of the Chavez Ravine area in Los Angeles by paying $494,000 for property valued at $92,000.
February 20 – Branch Rickey meets with officials of the proposed Western Carolinas League about pooling talent for Continental League clubs.
February 23 – Demolition of Ebbets Field begins. Lucy Monroe sings the National Anthem, and Roy Campanella is given an urn of dirt from behind home plate.

March–April
March 12 - The Cincinnati Reds sign Cuban prospect Tony Pérez, 17, as an amateur free agent. Pérez would go on to be a seven time all-star and key member of the Big Red Machine of the 1970s and was elected to the Baseball Hall of Fame in 2000.
March 13 – The Chicago White Sox unveil new road uniforms with the players' names above the number on the back, another innovation by Sox owner Bill Veeck.
March 24 – Commissioner Ford Frick says he will not allow the Continental League to pool players in the Western Carolinas League as it would violate existing major-minor league agreements.
March 26 – A Baltimore Orioles–Cincinnati Reds series scheduled for Havana, Cuba, is moved to Miami, Florida by Baltimore chief Lee MacPhail. The Reds, with a farm club in Cuba, want the trip, but the Orioles fear increased political unrest in the area.
March 31 – By a vote of 8–1, the Professional Baseball Rules Committee turns down a PCL proposal to use a designated hitter for the pitcher.
April 1 - The Los Angeles Dodgers sent minor league prospect Clyde Parris to Toronto of the International League in exchange for Joe Altobelli.
April 4 – The Chicago White Sox  send catcher Earl Battey and first baseman Don Mincher plus cash to the Washington Senators for first baseman Roy Sievers.
April 5 – The San Francisco Giants purchase first baseman Dale Long from the Chicago Cubs.
April 12:
With 42,269 fans in attendance, the San Francisco Giants edge the St. Louis Cardinals, 3–1, in the first game at San Francisco's Candlestick Park. Sam Jones pitches a three-hitter, and Cardinals outfielder Leon Wagner hits the first home run in the $15 million stadium.
Chuck Essegian bats an 11th-inning pinch-hit home run as the Los Angeles Dodgers beat the Chicago Cubs, 3–2, before a record Opening Day crowd (67,550) at Los Angeles. The home run is Essegian's third straight as a pinch hitter, including two in the 1959 World Series. Don Drysdale pitches all the way, striking out 14, for the win over Don Elston.
In a deal that will haunt the Cleveland Indians, GM Frank Lane sends Norm Cash to the Detroit Tigers for third baseman Steve Demeter. Cash will be Detroit's regular first baseman for the next 14 years and will hit 373 home runs for them. Demeter will play four games for Cleveland.
April 17:
On Easter Sunday, GM Frank Lane brings AL batting champ Harvey Kuenn to the Cleveland Indians and sends co-home run champ Rocky Colavito to the Detroit Tigers. Colavito, an unparalleled fan favorite in Cleveland, will hit 173 home runs before returning to Cleveland in 1965. Kuenn will report to Cleveland, pull a muscle, and never be the same hitter. He'll be traded after one season.
Eddie Mathews of the Milwaukee Braves hits his 300th home run, off Robin Roberts, plus a double and a triple, as Milwaukee beats the Philadelphia Phillies, 8–4. To date, only Jimmie Foxx hit his 300th at a younger age.
April 18:
In the American League opener at Washington, D.C., a week later than the National League start, President Dwight D. Eisenhower throws out the first ball, then watches the Senators' Camilo Pascual strike out 15 Boston Red Sox batters to tie Walter Johnson's team record. Boston's only run in a 10–1 loss is a Ted Williams home run, which makes Williams the first player to hit a home run in four different decades.
Trader Frank Lane continues to swap, sending Cleveland favorite Herb Score to the Chicago White Sox for Barry Latman. Score and Rocky Colavito, traded three days before, were the last two players to pre-date Lane's arrival in Cleveland.
April 19:
Before a home crowd of 41,661, Minnie Miñoso celebrates his return to the Chicago White Sox with a fourth-inning grand slam against the Kansas City Athletics. Leading off the bottom of the 9th with the score tied 9–9, Miñoso hits a solo homer for his sixth RBI.
On Patriot's Day at Fenway Park, Roger Maris makes his debut with the New York Yankees as he goes 4-for-5, including two home runs with four RBI. The Yankees spoil the Boston Red Sox opener with an 8–4 win.
The Detroit Tigers and Cleveland Indians play the longest season opener in major-league history, a 15-inning affair won by the Tigers 4-2 at Cleveland Stadium.
April 29 – At home, the St. Louis Cardinals crush the Chicago Cubs, 16–6. Stan Musial plays his 1,000th game at first base, becoming the first major league player ever with that many at two positions (1,513 games in the outfield). A bright spot for the Cubs is Ernie Banks hitting two home runs to break Gabby Hartnett's club record of 231 homers.

May
May 1 – Skinny Brown of the Baltimore Orioles pitches a 4–1 win over the Yankees. Brown allows just one hit, a first-inning home run by Mickey Mantle. Rookie Ron Hansen matches Mantle to up his RBI total to an American League high 32.
May 4:
The Chicago Cubs make a trade with WGN (AM) plucking Lou Boudreau out of the broadcast booth to replace Charlie Grimm (6-11) as Cubs manager. "Jolly Cholly" replaces Boudreau behind the mike. The Cubs win, 5–1, over the Pirates as pitcher Dick Ellsworth gains his first ML victory.
Baltimore Orioles catcher Gus Triandos sets a pair of American League records with three passed balls in one inning (6th) and four in one game, but knuckleballer Hoyt Wilhelm, making a rare start, goes seven innings and gets credit for a 6–4 Baltimore win over the Chicago White Sox. Early Wynn records his 2,000th strikeout in a no-decision effort for Chicago. Triandos' PB mark for an inning will be tied by reserve backstop Myron Ginsberg in six days, and Tom Egan will collect five PBs in 1970 to erase Triandos' name from the top of the list.
May 6 – The Dodgers send veteran outfielder Sandy Amorós to Detroit for first baseman Gail Harris.
May 7:
Pitcher Larry Sherry and catcher Norm Sherry of the Dodgers become the 10th sibling battery in ML history. Norman belts an 11th-inning home run to give his reliever brother Larry a 3–2 win against the Phillies.
Boston Red Sox pitcher Bill Monbouquette allows just one hit in beating the visiting Detroit Tigers, 5–0. Neil Chrisley's double is the only Tigers hit.
Takehiko Bessho becomes the winningest pitcher in Nippon Professional Baseball as his Tokyo Giants beat the Hanshin Tigers 6–3. Bessho has 302 wins in the league, one more than Victor Starfin.
May 10:
Catcher Joe Ginsberg of the Orioles loses a struggle with Hoyt Wilhelm's knuckleball facing the Athletics, and ties the record set six days earlier by teammate Gus Triandos with three passed balls in one inning.
Grand slams by Boston Red Sox teammates Vic Wertz and Rip Repulski at Fenway Park give Boston a 9–7 win over the Chicago White Sox. A former National League veteran, Repulski's eighth-inning shot off Don Ferrarese comes on his first American League at bat.
May 11:
Sam Jones pitches a two-hitter and draws a bases-loaded walk for the only run, as the Giants edge the visiting Phillies, 1–0. Jim Owens is the loser.
The Phillies announce a trade of first baseman Ed Bouchee and pitcher Don Cardwell to the Chicago Cubs for second baseman Tony Taylor and catcher Cal Neeman.
May 12 – Duplicating Sam Jones' effort of yesterday, the Giants' Jack Sanford pitches a two-hit, 1–0 win over the Phillies. Sanford matches Jones by striking out 11 and walking three.
May 13:
Mike McCormick's shutout of the Los Angeles Dodgers is the third straight by San Francisco Giants pitchers, following two-hitters against the Philadelphia Phillies by Sam Jones and Jack Sanford. The first-place Giants have seven straight wins.
Dick Groat of the Pittsburgh Pirates becomes the first National League player since Connie Ryan in 1953 to hit 6-for-6 as Pittsburgh beats the Milwaukee Braves, 8–2.
The Philadelphia Phillies suffer their third straight 1–0 shutout, losing to the hosting Cincinnati Reds. The Phillies, losers of back-to-back 1–0 games in San Francisco, tie the major-league record for straight 1–0 losses. Jim O'Toole's win is Cincinnati's ninth straight.
Two days after being traded from the Phillies to the Cubs, Don Cardwell pitches a no-hitter against the St. Louis Cardinals. A brilliant, leaping catch of Carl Sawatski's line drive by George Altman in the eighth inning saves Cardwell's gem. Ernie Banks' home run paces the 4–0 win, the first no-hitter against the Cards since May 11, 1919.
May 17 - Carl Furillo is released by the Los Angeles Dodgers. Forillo had been with the Dodgers since the team was in Brooklyn and the two time all-star was one of the last players who played with Jackie Robinson during Robinson's rookie season still on the roster.
May 19 – The New York Yankees send shortstop Andy Carey to the Kansas City Athletics for slugger Bob Cerv. Cerv had been with the Yankees for five years before going to KC where he hit 38 home runs in 1958 and was chosen as the American League left fielder in the All-Star game over Ted Williams. Cerv will be claimed in the 1960 expansion draft and the Yankees will again reacquire him.
May 25 – George Crowe of the St. Louis Cardinals set a major league record with his 11th pinch-hit home run, off Don McMahon, as the Cardinals win, 5–3, over the Braves. Crowe began the season tied with Smoky Burgess and Gus Zernial in most career pinch home runs.
May 27:
Since there is no rule limiting the size or shape of the catcher's mitt, Baltimore manager Paul Richards combats the team passed-ball problem while catching Hoyt Wilhelm (38 in 1959; 11 so far this year) by devising an oversized mitt to gather in Wilhelm's fluttering knuckleball. It is half again as large as the standard glove and 40 ounces heavier. Wilhelm goes the distance in beating New York, 3–2, at Yankee Stadium. Catcher Clint Courtney has no passed balls behind the plate.
Camilo Pascual strikes out 13 but the Washington Senators lose to the Boston Red Sox, 4–3, his third loss to Boston this year.
May 28 – Manager Casey Stengel is hospitalized with a virus and high fever and will miss 13 games. The Yankees go 7-6 under interim manager Ralph Houk.

June
June 12 – In a record-tying three-hour-and-52-minute, 9-inning game, Willie McCovey's pinch-hit grand slam, the first slam of his career, and Orlando Cepeda's three-run double pace the Giants to a 16–7 rout of the Braves.
June 15 – Mexico City and Poza Rica combine to hit 12 home runs in one game, a Mexican League record.
June 19 – In a brilliant pair of pitching performances, Orioles pitchers Hoyt Wilhelm and Milt Pappas threw shutouts to beat the host Detroit Tigers. Wilhelm allowed two hits in winning the opener, 2–0, over Jim Bunning, and Pappas allows three hits in winning the nightcap, 1–0, over Don Mossi. Jim Gentile and Ron Hansen collected home runs as catcher Clint Courtney, using the big glove designed by manager Paul Richards, is twice charged with batter interference, the first loading the bases in the 4th inning.
June 24 –  Willie Mays belted two home runs and made 10 putouts to lead the Giants in a 5–3 win at Cincinnati. Mays added three RBI, three runs scored, a single and stole home.
June 26 – Hoping to speed up the election process, the Hall of Fame changes its voting procedures. The new rules allow the Special Veterans Committee to vote annually, rather than every other year, and to induct up to two players a year. The BBWAA is authorized to hold a runoff election of the top 30 vote getters if no one is elected in the first ballot.
June 29 – The Cleveland Indians buy pitcher Don Newcombe from the Reds.
June 30 – Dick Stuart blasts three consecutive home runs, as the Pirates split with the Giants. Stuart drives in seven runs and joins Ralph Kiner as the second Pirates player to hit three home runs in a game at Forbes Field.

July
July 1 - Bobby Thomson, who hit the infamous 'shot heard around the world'  while playing for the New York Giants, is released by the Boston Red Sox. He is signed three days later by the Baltimore Orioles where he finishes his career.
July 4 – Mickey Mantle's three-run first-inning home run off Hal Woodeshick is the 300th of his career. Mantle becomes the 18th major leaguer to join the 300-HR club, but the Yankees drop a 9–8 decision to the Senators.
July 8 – The Cuban revolution led by Fidel Castro brought an end to Havana's International League team. The Sugar Kings relocate in Jersey City, marking that city's return to the International League after a 10-year absence. Poor attendance at Roosevelt Stadium prompts the parent Cincinnati Reds to cease the minor league operation there following the 1961 season.
 The Reds sign Pete Rose, a 19-year-old amateur free agent and graduate of Western Hills High School. Rose would go on to be baseball's time hits leader. 
July 9 – Jim Coates suffers his first loss after nine straight wins, and 14 straight over two seasons, as the Boston Red Sox beat the Yankees, 6–5. The Sox are led by Vic Wertz, who hit a home run, double and single to drive in four runs. Coates' major-league career-record is 17–2.
 The Los Angeles Dodgers release minor league pitcher Tommy Lasorda. 
July 11 – At KC Municipal Stadium, one-hit three-innings shutout pitching by Bob Friend and home runs by Ernie Banks and Del Crandall paced the National League to a 5–4 win over the American League in the first of two All-Star Games. Friend, of the Pittsburgh Pirates, has notched two of the NL's last three All-Star wins.
July 13 – At Yankee Stadium, Vern Law became the second Pirates pitcher to win a 1960 All-Star Game, working two scoreless innings. Stan Musial came off the National League bench and hit his record sixth and last All-Star Game home run. Willie Mays, Ken Boyer and Eddie Mathews also homered in the 6–0 NL win, the third shutout in All-Star Game history. Law (1st, 2nd) combined the eight-hit shutout along with Johnny Podres (3rd), Stan Williams (5th, 6th), Larry Jackson (7th), Bill Henry (8th) and Lindy McDaniel (9th). Whitey Ford was the loser.
July 18 – The National League votes to expand to 10 clubs if the Continental League does not join organized baseball. The new NL clubs would invade CL territories.
July 19:
In a spectacular ML debut, Juan Marichal of the San Francisco Giants pitches no-hit ball until Clay Dalrymple pinch-hit singles with two out in the 7th inning. Marichal winds up with 12 strikeouts and a one-hit 2–0 win against the Phillies, becoming the first National League pitcher since 1900 to debut with a one-hitter.
Roy Sievers' 21-game hitting streak, the longest for any player in the season, ends, but Chicago White Sox teammate Luis Aparicio's inside-the-park home run and Billy Pierce's shutout beat Boston, 6–0.
Senators ace Pedro Ramos pitches a one-hitter 5–0 shutout over Detroit. Rocky Colavito's leadoff single in the eighth inning, a grounder that eludes shortstop José Valdivielso, is the lone safety.
July 20 – At Cleveland Municipal Stadium, Mickey Mantle golfs a Gary Bell pitch over the auxiliary scoreboard into the distant upper deck in right field, matching Luke Easter as the only major league players to reach that spot. Cleveland holds on for an 8–6 win over the Yankees.
July 21 – Robin Roberts pitches his third career one-hitter, and the 3rd one-hitter of the season in new Candlestick Park. Felipe Alou spoils Roberts' no-hit bid in the fifth inning of a 3–0 Phillies victory; third baseman Joe Morgan fields the batted ball, but falls down and cannot make a throw.
July 22 – At Fenway Park, the Boston Red Sox down the Cleveland Indians, 6–4. Vic Wertz has a three-run home run and four RBI. Ted Williams also homers, and in the 7th inning, steals second base. Williams sets a major league record as the only player to steal bases in four consecutive decades. He'll be matched by Rickey Henderson in 2000. The Indians' Jimmy Piersall homers twice, both off winner Ike Delock.
July 23 – Kansas City outfielder Whitey Herzog hits into the only All-Cuban Triple Play in ML history. The action goes from Washington Senators starting pitcher Pedro Ramos, to first baseman Julio Bécquer, to shortstop José Valdivielso. The victory, however, goes to reliever Chuck Stobbs (7-2) as the Senators take an 8–3 decision. Harmon Killebrew has a two-run home run.
July 27 – William Shea, chairman of Mayor Robert Wagner's New York baseball committee, announces the formation of the Continental League. The five founding cities are New York City, Houston, Toronto, Denver and Minneapolis/St. Paul.
July 30 – Just as he predicts, Philadelphia Phillies pitcher Art Mahaffey picks off the first batter to get a hit against him. Then with the next batter to get a hit, he does it again. Curt Flood and Bill White of the St. Louis Cardinals are the base runner victims, but St. Louis still wins, 6–3. In his next game, the first batter to get a hit off Mahaffey will be Jim Marshall, and Mahaffey will pick him off as well.

August
August 2 – In an agreement with the major leagues, the Continental League abandons plans to join the American League and National League. Walter O'Malley, chairman of the NL Expansion Committee, says, "We immediately will recommend expansion and that we would like to do it in 1961." Milwaukee Braves owner Lou Perini proposes a compromise that four of the CL territories be admitted to the current majors in orderly expansion. Branch Rickey's group quickly accepts. The Continental League ends without playing a game.
August 3 – In an unusual move, Cleveland Indians GM Frank Lane trades managers with Detroit Tigers GM Bill DeWitt. The Indians' Joe Gordon (49-46) is dealt to the Tigers for Jimmy Dykes (44-52). For one game, until the pair can change places, Jo-Jo White pilots the Indians and Billy Hitchcock guides the Tigers.
August 7 – The Chicago White Sox win a pair from the Washington Senators, with reliever Gerry Staley picking up two victories. Staley will be 13–8, all in relief, with both wins and losses topping the American League relievers.
August 8 – A day crowd of 48,323, the largest day crowd ever at Comiskey Park, cheers White Sox pitcher Billy Pierce's four-hit victory over the Yankees, 9–1. Pierce faces just 31 batters.
August 9 – With fine relief pitching of Lindy McDaniel in the opener and a five-hitter by Curt Simmons in the nightcap, the St. Louis Cardinals sweep the Philadelphia Phillies, 5–4 and 6–0. Phillies Tony Taylor ties a major league record for a second baseman by going the entire doubleheader (18 innings) without a putout – the first to achieve the feat since Connie Ryan, of the Phillies, on June 14, 1953.
August 10 – Ted Williams  blasts a pair of home runs and a double to pace the Red Sox to a 6–1 win over the Cleveland Indians. Williams has 21 homers for the season. The first of the two today, #512, moves him past Mel Ott into fourth place on the all-time list. After the game, Williams announces that he will retire at the end of the season.
August 18 – At County Stadium, Lew Burdette of the Milwaukee Braves no-hits the Philadelphia Phillies 1-0. He faces the minimum 27 batters, a fifth-inning hit-by-pitch to Tony González being the only Phillies base runner; González is retired on Lee Walls' double play ground ball one batter later. Burdette also helps his own cause by scoring the only run of the game; after doubling to lead off the eighth, he scores on Bill Bruton's double one batter later.
August 20 – Ted Williams draws the 2,000th walk of his career in the Red Sox' split of a twi-night doubleheader with the Orioles. Williams joins Babe Ruth as the only major leaguers to collect 2,000 walks. Rickey Henderson in 2000, and Barry Bonds in 2003, will join the select 2,000 walks group.
August 23 – Following up his no-hitter, Lew Burdette fires his third shutout in a row, pitching the Milwaukee Braves to a 7–0 win over the Los Angeles Dodgers.
August 27 – After pitching 32 shutout innings, Braves pitcher Lew Burdette gives up a Felipe Alou home run as San Francisco defeats the Braves 3–1.
August 30 – Boston Red Sox second baseman Pete Runnels goes 6-for-7, as Boston edges the Tigers in the 15-inning opener of a twin bill. Runnels’ 15th-inning double brings Frank Malzone home with the winning run to win, 5–4. Runnels has three more hits in the nightcap victory, 3–2 in 10 innings. His six hits are the most in an American League game since July 8, 1955. With 9-for-11 in the doubleheader, Runnels ties the major league record.

September
September 2 – Boston's Ted Williams hits a home run off Don Lee of the Senators. Williams had homered against Lee's father, Thornton, 20 years earlier.
September 3:
A battle of left-handed pitchers features Sandy Koufax of the LA Dodgers against Mike McCormick of the SF Giants. Felipe Alou's home run gives McCormick a 1–0 win, his second 1–0 win against Los Angeles in 1960.
In the International League, Al Cicotte of the Toronto Maple Leafs pitches an 11-inning no-hitter against Montreal.
September 6 – In his final game at Yankee Stadium, Ted Williams hits his 518th career home run in a Red Sox 7–1 win.
September 10 – In Detroit, the Yankees' Mickey Mantle hits a home run in the 6th inning, the ball clearing the right field roof and landing in the Brooks Lumber Yard across Trumbull Avenue. In June 1985, Mantle's blow was retroactively measured at 643 feet, and will be listed in the Guinness Book of World Records at that distance.
September 13 – 18-year-old outfielder Danny Murphy becomes the youngest Chicago Cubs player to hit a home run when he clouts a three-run homer off Bob Purkey of the Cincinnati Reds, as the Reds win 8–6 at home. Murphy will play just 49 games for the Cubs from 1960 to 1962. He will come back as a pitcher for the Chicago White Sox in 1969-70.
September 15 – Willie Mays ties the modern major league record with three triples in a game against the Phillies. The last National League player to hit three triples in a game was Roberto Clemente, in 1958.
September 16:
At the age of 39, Warren Spahn notches his 11th 20-win season with a 4–0 no-hitter against the Phillies. Spahn also sets a Milwaukee club record with 15 strikeouts in handing the last-place Phils their 90th loss of the year.
The Baltimore Orioles (83-58) and New York Yankees (82-57) open a crucial four games series with the Orioles just .002 in back of New York. Three days later, during a doubleheader, the Yankees will sweep Baltimore. The faltering Birds, now four back, will end up in second place, eight games back.
September 18 – At Wrigley Field, Ernie Banks sets a record by drawing his 27th intentional walk of the season.
September 19 – The Chicago White Sox pennant hopes are damaged with a nightcap 7–6 loss to the Detroit Tigers, after they win the opener, 8–4. Pinch hitter Norm Cash scores the decisive run in game two. Cash thus ends the season by grounding into no double plays, becoming the first American League player since league records on this were started in 1940. Teammates Dick McAuliffe and Roger Repoz will duplicate this in 1968.
September 20 – Boston Red Sox outfielder Carroll Hardy pinch-hits for Ted Williams, who is forced to leave the game after fouling a ball off his ankle, and grounds into a double play. On May 31, 1961, Hardy  will pinch hit for rookie Carl Yastrzemski, making him the only player to go in for both future Hall of Famers. Hardy also hit his first major league home run pinch-hitting for Roger Maris when both were at Cleveland (May 18, 1958).
September 25:
For the first time since 1927, the Pittsburgh Pirates are headed for the World Series.
Ralph Terry clinches the New York Yankees 25th pennant with a 4–3 win over the Boston Red Sox. Luis Arroyo saves the win. It is Casey Stengel's 10th pennant in 12 years at New York.
September 28 –  In his last major league at bat, Ted Williams picks out a 1-1 pitch by Baltimore's Jack Fisher and drives it 450 feet into the right-center field seats behind the Boston bullpen. It is Williams' 521st and last career home run, putting him third on the all-time list. Williams stays in the dugout, ignoring the thunderous ovation at Fenway Park, and refused to tip his hat to the hometown fans. However, they would make up for that 39 years later.

October
October 2 – The Baltimore Orioles defeat the Washington Senators 2-1 at Griffith Stadium in the Senators' final game before their move to the Minneapolis–St. Paul area. Milt Pappas wins the pitchers' duel against Pedro Ramos, who gives up a home run to Jackie Brandt for the deciding run.
October 3 – The New York Yankees head into the World Series with a 15-game winning streak, the 8th longest streak in the American League this century, after Dale Long's two-run 9th-inning home run gives them an 8–7 win over the Boston Red Sox. The 193 home runs are an AL season record, three better than the 1956 Yankees. RBI leader Roger Maris drives in three runs, but falls one home run short of Mickey Mantle's league-high 40.
October 5 – In a portent of things to come, Bill Mazeroski's two-run 5th-inning home run off Jim Coates is the difference as Pittsburgh beats the Yankees 6–4 in its first World Series win since 1925. Roy Face survives a two-run 9th-inning Elston Howard home run to preserve Vern Law's victory.
October 6 – Mickey Mantle hits two home runs in a Yankees 16–3 victory at Forbes Field, evening the World Series. A seven-run 6th inning overwhelms Pittsburgh.
October 8 – At Yankee Stadium, Bobby Richardson collects six RBI, including a grand slam off reliever Clem Labine in a six-run first inning, and Whitey Ford pitches a four-hitter 10–0 shutout to give the Yankees a 2-1 World Series lead, spoiling Pittsburgh manager Danny Murtaugh's 43rd birthday.
October 9 – Vern Law wins again, thanks to his own RBI single and Bill Virdon's two-run hit. Roy Face retires the final eight batters in order. The Pittsburgh Pirates 3–2 win evens the 1960 World Series.
October 10 – Bill Mazeroski stars again. His two-run double stakes Harvey Haddix to a 3–0 lead. Roy Face is called on once more for another hitless effort to preserve a 5–2 win over the Yankees and 3-2 World Series lead for the surprising Pirates.
October 12 – In Game Six of the World Series, Whitey Ford preserves the Yankees hopes with a seven-hit shutout at Forbes Field. Bob Friend is bombed again as the Yankees coasts 12–0. Bobby Richardson's two run-scoring triples give him a WS record of 12 RBI.
October 13 – The Pittsburgh Pirates defeat the New York Yankees, 10-9, in Game 7 of the World Series, to win their third World Championship, and first since 1925, four games to three. In a 9–9 tie, Bill Mazeroski leads off the last of the ninth inning and hits what is arguably the most dramatic home run in WS history, off Yankees P Ralph Terry. The drama of Mazeroski's home run was heightened by the excitement that preceded the home run:  A combined total of seven runs were scored by both teams in a wild and whacky bottom of the eighth and top of the ninth.  An oddity in this game – it is the only World Series game this century with no strikeouts recorded. Another oddity, this one to the 1960 World Series itself – Mazeroski's home run makes this 1960 World Series the only World Series in Major League history won by a home run in the bottom of the ninth inning of the seventh and deciding game.  Despite Mazeroski's heroics, however, Yankees 2B Bobby Richardson is named the Series MVP, as the Yankees outscore Pittsburgh, 55 to 27.
October 17 – The National League votes to admit Houston and New York City teams to the league in 1962, the first structural change since 1900, and to go to a 10-team league.
October 18 – Instituting a mandatory retirement age of 65, New York Yankees co-owners Dan Topping and Del Webb relieve Casey Stengel as the team manager. Stengel says "I wasn't retired—they fired me." The veteran skipper has a  1,149-696 career record.
October 20 – Coach Ralph Houk, at age 41, is named to succeed Casey Stengel as the Yankees manager. Houk briefly led the Yankees in 1960 when Stengel was hospitalized.
October 26 – Trying to jump ahead of the National League, the American League admits Los Angeles and Minneapolis teams to the league with plans to have the new clubs begin competition in 1961 in the new 10-team league. Calvin Griffith is given permission to move the existing Washington Senators franchise to Minneapolis–St. Paul, Minnesota. (An expansion team, also called the Senators, will be placed in Washington.) American League president Joe Cronin says the league will play a 162-game schedule, with 18 games against each opponent. The National League will balk, saying the two expansions are not analogous and that the American League was not invited to move into LA.
October 31- The San Francisco Giants acquire Alvin Dark from the Milwaukee Braves in exchange for infielder Andre Rodgers. However, Dark is not acquired as a player, but instead is acquired so he can become the team's manager.

November–December
November 2 – Hank Greenberg asks for American League dates at the Los Angeles Coliseum, home of the National League Dodgers. Greenberg and Bill Veeck are expected to run the new Los Angeles club in the AL. On November 17, Greenberg will drop out of the bidding to run the new franchise.
November 21 – Bob Scheffing signs to manage the Detroit Tigers after the job is turned down by Casey Stengel.
November 22 – The American League proposes that both leagues expand to nine teams in 1961 and begin interleague play. It will delay entering the Los Angeles market if the National League agrees. (There will be expansion to 10 teams in the American League in 1961, followed by the National League doing so in 1962, but interleague play does not arrive until .)
November 23 – Los Angeles Dodgers outfielder Frank Howard is selected National League Rookie of the Year with 12 of 24 votes. The six-foot, nine-inch Howard belted 23 home runs during the regular season.
November 26 – The relocated American League team in the Twin Cities of Minneapolis – Saint Paul chooses the appropriate nickname Twins to represent its franchise. The team recently moved from Washington, D.C., where they were known as the Senators.
December 3 - The Milwaukee Brewers purchase the contract of Billy Martin from the Cincinnati Reds.
December 5 – American League president Joe Cronin suggests that if the National League starts its new New York City franchise in 1961, the AL will stay out of Los Angeles until 1962. The NL turned down the suggested compromise of November 22 because Houston will not be ready in 1961.
December 6 – A group headed by movie star Gene Autry and former football star Bob Reynolds is awarded the new American League Los Angeles Angels. Charlie Finley withdraws his bid for Los Angeles and offers to purchase control of the Kansas City Athletics. On December 20, Finley will buy 52 percent of the A's from Arnold Johnson's estate.
December 21 – Chicago Cubs owner Philip K. Wrigley says his team will have no manager, but will use a college of coaches.

Births

January
January 3 – Randy Hunt
January 4 – Paul Gibson
January 8 – Randy Ready
January 8 – Julio Solano
January 9 – Norifumi Nishimura
January 10 – Bob Brower
January 10 – Kelvin Torve
January 12 – Tim Hulett
January 12 – Mike Marshall
January 12 – Mike Trujillo
January 14 – Ross Jones
January 15 – Curt Brown
January 17 – Chili Davis
January 18 – Gibson Alba
January 21 – Andy Hawkins
January 21 – Darryl Motley
January 23 – Reggie Ritter
January 28 – Stu Pederson
January 29 – Steve Sax

February
February 1 – Cecilio Guante
February 2 – Buddy Biancalana
February 4 – Tim Pyznarski
February 16 – Eric Bullock
February 16 – Bill Pecota
February 18 – Bob Fallon
February 24 – Nick Esasky
February 29 – Bill Long

March
March 2 – Mike Woodard
March 3 – Chuck Cary
March 3 – Neal Heaton
March 4 – Jeff Dedmon
March 6 – Rick Behenna
March 7 – Joe Carter
March 8 – Kevin Hagen
March 14 – Kirby Puckett
March 14 – Jerry Willard
March 15 – Mike Pagliarulo
March 18 – Matt Winters
March 20 – Mike Young
March 22 – Scott Bradley
March 22 – Matt Sinatro
March 24 – Dwight Taylor

April
April 2 – Tom Barrett
April 3 – Tim Conroy
April 4 – John Lickert
April 5 – Jim Scranton
April 12 – Bill Lindsey
April 14 – Paul Hodgson
April 15 – Mike Diaz
April 16 – Curt Young
April 19 – Frank Viola
April 20 – Randy Kutcher
April 21 – Greg Legg
April 26 – Steve Lombardozzi
April 27 – Jim Eppard
April 27 – Brian Giles
April 28 – Tom Browning
April 28 – John Cerutti
April 28 – Mark Ryal

May
May 1 – Charlie O'Brien
May 4 – Tim Tschida
May 9 – Tony Gwynn
May 13 – Lenny Faedo
May 21 – Kent Hrbek
May 26 – Rob Murphy
May 31 – Jeff Schaefer

June
June 2 – Lemmie Miller
June 3 – Barry Lyons
June 3 – Steve Lyons
June 7 – Jim Paciorek
June 14 – Mike Laga
June 14 – Pat Larkin
June 20 – Doug Gwosdz
June 20 – Larry See
June 22 – Greg Booker
June 23 – Jim Deshaies
June 23 – John Rabb
June 26 – Pete Dalena
June 27 – Jackie Gutiérrez
June 30 – Al Newman

July
July 3 – Jack Daugherty
July 6 – Germán Rivera
July 8 – Mike Ramsey
July 13 – Mike Fitzgerald
July 16 – Terry Pendleton
July 20 – Mike Witt
July 24 – Jeff Kaiser
July 28 – Carmelo Martínez
July 29 – Daryl Smith
July 30 – Steve Ellsworth

August
August 1 – Dave Anderson
August 3 – Sid Bream
August 4 – Steve Davis
August 9 – Stan Clarke
August 11 – Al Pedrique
August 14 – Edwin Rodríguez
August 16 – Bill Mooneyham
August 18 – Mike LaValliere
August 19 – Ron Darling
August 19 – Sap Randall
August 20 – Tom Brunansky
August 20 – Mark Langston
August 20 – Ed Wojna
August 23 – Ed Hearn
August 23 – Randy St. Claire
August 24 – Cal Ripken Jr.
August 25 – Bobby Meacham
August 29 – Bill Latham
August 29 – Rusty Tillman
August 29 – Reggie Williams
August 30 – Randy O'Neal
August 30 – Rick Seilheimer
August 31 – Morris Madden

September
September 2 – Rex Hudler
September 3 – Rene Gonzales
September 5 – Tim Birtsas
September 5 – John Christensen
September 5 – Chris Green
September 5 – Candy Maldonado
September 6 – Al Lachowicz
September 6 – Greg Olson
September 7 – Wade Rowdon
September 9 – Alvin Davis
September 12 – Trench Davis
September 15 – Todd Fischer
September 16 – Mel Hall
September 16 – Dan Jennings
September 16 – Mickey Tettleton
September 17 – John Franco
September 18 – Scott Earl
September 19 – Phil Stephenson
September 20 – Dave Gallagher
September 20 – Randy Kramer
September 21 – Rick Rodriguez
September 22 – Mark Hirschbeck
September 25 – Dave Walsh
September 29 – Rob Deer
September 29 – Howard Johnson

October
October 2 – Ernest Riles
October 4 – Joe Boever
October 4 – Billy Hatcher
October 5 – Randy Bockus
October 6 – Jay Baller
October 6 – Bruce Fields
October 6 – Bill Johnson
October 6 – Jeff Zaske
October 10 – Bill Moore
October 11 – Curt Ford
October 14 – Bill Bathe
October 17 – Ken Dixon
October 18 – Terry Clark
October 18 – Steve Kiefer
October 19 – Mark Davis
October 21 – Franklin Stubbs
October 25 – Kelly Downs
October 27 – Tom Nieto
October 27 – Ron Shepherd
October 28 – Mark Knudson
October 30 – José Escobar
October 30 – Gerald Perry
October 30 – Lee Tunnell
October 30 – Dave Valle
October 31 – Mike Gallego

November
November 1 – Fernando Valenzuela
November 6 – Ron Romanick
November 11 – Gary Jones
November 11 – Jeff Ransom
November 12 – Donnie Hill
November 15 – Rick Luecken
November 16 – Curt Wardle
November 21 – Mark Eichhorn
November 22 – Gene Walter
November 22 – Colin Ward
November 26 – Harold Reynolds
November 28 – Ken Howell
November 29 – Howard Johnson
November 30 – Bob Tewksbury

December
December 3 – Gene Nelson
December 4 – David Green
December 8 – John Mizerock
December 9 – Juan Samuel
December 10 – Paul Assenmacher
December 10 – Jeff Bettendorf
December 13 – Jeff Robinson
December 14 – Mike Rizzo
December 20 – José DeLeón
December 21 – Roger McDowell
December 21 – Andy Van Slyke
December 24 – John Costello
December 25 – Ty Gainey
December 25 – Tom O'Malley
December 26 – Jeff Stone
December 28 – Zane Smith
December 28 – Carl Willis
December 29 – Jim Wilson

Deaths

January
January 2 – Ken Gables, 40, pitcher who worked in 62 total games for 1945–1947 Pittsburgh Pirates
January 10 – Bunny Fabrique, 72, shortstop for the 1916–1917 Brooklyn Robins who got into 27 career big-league games
January 12 – Jimmy Lavender, 75, pitcher for the Chicago Cubs from 1912 to 1916, and for the Philadelphia Phillies in 1917
January 15 – Frankie Austin, 43, Panamanian shortstop who played in 251 games for the 1944–1948 Philadelphia Stars of the Negro National League; batted .337 lifetime and was selected to six All-Star teams
January 19 – Bob Fagan, 65, second baseman for the 1921 Kansas City Monarchs and 1923 St. Louis Stars of the Negro National League
January 20 – Gibby Brack, 51, outfielder/first baseman for the Brooklyn Dodgers and Philadelphia Phillies who played in 315 games between 1937 and 1939
January 24 – Russ Ford, 76, Canadian pitcher who twirled for the New York Highlanders/Yankees (1909–1913) and Buffalo of the "outlaw" Federal League (1914–1915); three-time 20-game winner (1910, 1911, 1914) — including a 26-game-winning campaign for the 1910 Highlanders; inducted into the Canadian Baseball Hall of Fame (1987)
January 25 – Palmer Hildebrand, 75, catcher who appeared in 26 games for the 1913 St. Louis Cardinals
January 28 – Bill Warren, 75, Federal League catcher who played 31 games in 1914–1915 for Indianapolis and Newark

February
February 6 – Noodles Hahn, 80, left-handed hurler for the Cincinnati Reds (1899–1905) and New York Highlanders (1906); won 22 or more games during four of his seven seasons with Cincinnati
February 11 – Fritz Clausen, 90, a 19th-century pitcher for the Louisville Colonels and Chicago Colts
February 11 – Roy Mack, 71, son of Connie Mack; vice president of the Philadelphia Athletics from 1936 to August 1950, and co-owner with his brother Earle from that point to November 1954, when the Mack brothers sold the Philadelphia franchise to banker and real-estate magnate Arnold Johnson (died March 6, 1960), who moved it to Kansas City for 1955
February 16 – Stuffy McInnis, 69, excellent fielding first baseman (committed only one error in 152 games and 1,652 chances for a .9994 fielding percentage in 1921); batted .307 lifetime for six clubs, most prominently with the Philadelphia Athletics' "$100,000 infield" (1909–1917); four-time World Series champion with A's (1911, 1913), Boston Red Sox (1918) and Pittsburgh Pirates (1925); managed National League Phillies to an abysmal 51–103 mark in 1927 then became a longtime college baseball coach
February 16 – Jasper Washington, 63, first- and third baseman who played in the Negro leagues between 1921 and 1933, notably for the Homestead Grays

March
March 2 – Howie Camnitz, 78, pitcher who spent nine of his 11 MLB seasons with the Pittsburgh Pirates (1904, 1906–1913); won 20 or more games three times for the Pirates, and was a member of 1909 World Series champions
March 3 – Toussaint Allen, 63, outfielder in the Negro leagues from 1914 to 1928
March 6 – Arnold Johnson, 54, Chicago-based businessman who purchased the Philadelphia Athletics in November 1954, transferred the franchise to Kansas City for 1955, and owned the team until his death
March 10 – Jim Holmes, 78, pitched in 18 career games as a member of the 1906 Philadelphia Athletics and 1908 Brooklyn Superbas
March 17 – Bob Thorpe, 24, pitcher who appeared in two games for the 1955 Chicago Cubs
March 18 – Dixie Howell, 40, relief pitcher for the 1940 Cleveland Indians, 1949 Cincinnati Reds and 1955–1958 Chicago White Sox; combat veteran of World War II who, starting in September 1944, spent six months in captivity as a POW; still an active player when he died from a heart attack during spring training drills in Florida
March 21 – Mack Stewart, 45, relief pitcher who appeared in 24 games for the 1943–1944 Chicago Cubs during World War II
March 22 – Gordon Rhodes, 52, pitcher who played from 1929 to 1936 for the New York Yankees, Boston Red Sox and Philadelphia Athletics
March 29 – Kid Carsey, 87, pitcher/outfielder who played in 329 games (296 on the mound) for six clubs between 1891 and 1901; lost 37 games in one season (1891) as a pitcher for the Washington Statesmen of the then-major-league American Association; won 24 games for Philadelphia Phillies in 1895
March 30 – Joe Connolly, 65, outfielder for the New York Giants, Cleveland Indians and Boston Red Sox in the 1920s

April
April 17 – Ricardo Torres, 69, Cuban catcher who played in 22 games for the 1920–1922 Washington Senators; father of Gil Torres
April 19 – Vallie Eaves, 48, pitcher who appeared in 24 total MLB games for 1935 Philadelphia Athletics, 1939–1940 Chicago White Sox, and 1941–1942 Chicago Cubs
April 19 – Bob Osborn, 57, pitcher who went 27–17 (4.32) in 121 career games for Chicago Cubs (1925–1927 and 1929–1930) and Pittsburgh Pirates (1931)
April 22 – Johnson Hill, 69, third baseman who played in the Negro leagues between 1910 and 1927
April 30 – Oscar "Cannonball" Owens, 66, outfielder/pitcher in the Negro leagues of the 1920s; in the two seasons (1922, 1929) for which Baseball Reference lists his batting statistics, he hit .398 during his 61-game career (74-for-186)
April 30 – Herman Pillette, 64, pitcher in 106 games for 1923–1925 Detroit Tigers (and one contest for 1917 Cincinnati Reds); won 19 games for 1923 Tigers, then lost 19 for 1924 Bengals; father of Duane Pillette

May
May 1 – Lou Schettler, 73, Philadelphia Phillies pitcher who worked in 27 games in 1910
May 6 – Vern Bickford, 39, pitcher who won 66 games for the Boston/Milwaukee Braves (1948–1953), including a no-hitter on August 11, 1950, against the Brooklyn Dodgers
May 6 – Merlin Kopp, 68, outfielder for the 1915 Washington Senators and 1918–1919 Philadelphia Athletics
May 8 – Howie Camp, 66, outfielder in five games for 1917 New York Yankees
May 12 – Gus Felix, 64, outfielder for the Boston Braves (1923–1925) and Brooklyn Robins (1926–1927); finished third in the National League in putouts by a centerfielder in 1925
May 20 – Pat Collins, 63, catcher who appeared in 543 games for three MLB clubs over ten seasons spanning 1919 and 1929, most notably the 1926–1928 New York Yankees, when he contributed to three consecutive American League pennants and 1927–1928 World Series titles; most-used of three platoon catchers for 1927 "Murderers' Row" edition and started Games 1 and 4 of Bombers' 1927 Series sweep of Pittsburgh, going 3-for-3 in Series-clinching contest
May 21 – Leo Birdine, 65, pitcher/outfielder/third baseman who played in 129 games for the Birmingham Black Barons and Memphis Red Sox of the Negro leagues between 1927 and 1932
May 21 – George Cochran, 71, a third baseman for the 1918 Boston Red Sox
May 30 – George Hildebrand, 81, American League umpire from 1913 to 1934 who worked in four World Series; outfielder for Brooklyn in 1902, also credited with developing the spitball while in the minor leagues

June
June 1 – Harry Dean, 45, relief pitcher with two appearances and two innings pitched for 1941 Washington Senators
June 10 – Vic Delmore, 44, National League umpire who worked 618 league games from 1956 through 1959; home plate umpire on June 30, 1959, when confusion over a foul tip resulted in two baseballs "in play" at the same time
June 12 – Art Wilson, 74, catcher whose 14-year (1908–1921) career was spent in three major leagues; appeared in 812 games for New York, Pittsburgh, Chicago and Boston of the National League, Chicago of the Federal circuit, and Cleveland of the American League 
June 25 – Tommy Corcoran, 91, longtime shortstop, and captain of the Cincinnati Reds for 10 years
June 27 – Square Moore, 59, stocky pitcher who appeared in 76 games for five Negro National League teams between 1924 and 1928

July
July 3 – "Reindeer Bill" Killefer, 72, catcher who played 13 seasons (1909–1921) for three MLB clubs (St. Louis Browns, Philadelphia Phillies and Chicago Cubs) and gained fame as Hall of Fame pitcher Grover Cleveland Alexander's favorite receiver; spent 48 years in professional baseball, including all or part of nine years as manager of the Cubs between 1921 and 1925 and Browns between 1930 and 1933; as a scout, signed the American League's first black player, Hall of Famer Larry Doby, for the Cleveland Indians in 1947
July 4 – Frank Parkinson, 65, second baseman and shortstop for the 1921–1924 Philadelphia Phillies, appearing in 378 MLB games.
July 8 – Joe Krakauskas, 45, Canadian southpaw hurler who worked in 149 career games for Washington Senators and Cleveland Indians from 1937–1942 and in 1946
July 13 – Mark Scott, 45, television play-by-play announcer for the 1956 Cincinnati Redlegs and minor-league Hollywood Stars, and host/producer of the 1959 TV series Home Run Derby, which was discontinued upon his death but remains in syndication
July 14 – Al Kellett, 58, pitcher for the Boston Red Sox and Philadelphia Athletics in the 1920s
July 14 – Walter Thornton, 85, pitcher/outfielder for Chicago Colts/Orphans of the National League, 1895–1898; later became a street preacher
July 17 – Pat Duncan, 66, Cincinnati Reds outfielder who was the first player to homer over Crosley Field's left-field fence
July 18 – Terry Turner, 79, shortstop for the Cleveland Naps and Indians, who led American League shortstops in fielding percentage four times, ranks among the top 10 Cleveland all-timers in seven different offensive categories, and set team-records with 1,619 games played and 4,603 putouts that still stand
July 19 – Charlie Whitehouse, 66, southpaw who pitched in 25 games for Indianapolis and Newark (Federal League} in 1914–1915 and Washington (American League) in 1919
July 28 – Ken Landenberger, 31, minor league slugger and briefly a first baseman for the 1952 White Sox; manager of the Class D Selma Cloverleafs until mid-July 1960 when, stricken with acute leukemia, he stepped aside; he died by month's end
July 28 – Marty Kavanagh, 69, second baseman for the Detroit Tigers, Cleveland Indians and St. Louis Cardinals in the 1910s
July 31 – Joe Klinger, 57, first baseman and catcher whose 12-year pro career was interrupted by two very brief MLB stints with 1927 New York Giants and 1930 Chicago White Sox

August
August 5 – George Chalmers, 72, native of Scotland and Philadelphia Phillies pitcher from 1910 to 1916, working in 121 games; started and lost Game 4 of the 1915 World Series
August 11 – Harry McChesney, 80, outfielder who played 22 games for 1904 Chicago Cubs
August 12 – Leo Murphy, 71, catcher for the 1915 Pittsburgh Pirates and manager of the AAGPBL Racine Belles
August 12 – Herlen Ragland, 64, southpaw who pitched in 12 games and played outfield in two more during his two years (1920–1921) in the Negro National League
August 14 – Fred Clarke, 87, Hall of Fame left fielder (1894–1911, 1913–1915) and player-manager of the Louisville Colonels (NL) and Pittsburgh Pirates (1897–1915) who batted .312 in his career, and became one of the first dozen players to make 2,500 hits and the first manager to win 1,500 games; led Pirates to 1909 World Series title.
August 14 – Henry Keupper, 73, left-hander for the 1914 St. Louis Terriers who led Federal League pitchers in games lost (20) in his only season
August 15 – Ed Wheeler, 82, infielder who appeared in 30 games for the 1902 Brooklyn Superbas
August 20 – George Perring, 76, infielder who played 513 games for the 1908–1910 Cleveland Naps (American League) and 1914–1915 Kansas City Packers (Federal League)
August 21 – John Kelleher, 66, backup infielder for the St. Louis Cardinals, Brooklyn Robins, Chicago Cubs and Boston Braves from 1912 to 1924
August 25 – Fred Crolius, 83, outfielder for Boston and Pittsburgh of the National League in 1901 and 1902, appearing in 58 games in all.

September
September 2 – Billy Maloney, 82, outfielder/catcher who played in 696 games for four clubs between 1901 and 1908
September 3 – Armando Marsans, 72, Cuban outfielder/first baseman and one of the first men from his native country to play in the majors; appeared in 655 games for four teams between 1911 and 1918
September 13 – Ralph Mattis, 70, outfielder in 36 games for the 1914 Pittsburgh Rebels (Federal League)
September 18 – King Brockett, 80, pitcher/outfielder/third baseman who appeared in 54 games (50 on the mound) for the New York Highlanders of 1907, 1909 and 1911
September 23 – Paul Hinson, 56, utility player for the 1928 Boston Red Sox
September 27 – Jim Eschen, 69, outfielder/pinch hitter for 1915 Cleveland Indians who played in 15 midsummer games

October
October 4 – Jack Warhop, 76, submarine-style pitcher for the New York Highlanders/Yankees who appeared in 221 games between 1908 and 1915
October 9 – Oscar "Heavy" Johnson, 65, slugging catcher of the Negro leagues between 1920 and 1933; two-time Negro National League batting champion, hitting .370 lifetime, including two seasons (1922, 1923) during which he hit .406; won the league's Triple Crown in 1922
October 10 – Hub Hart, 82, lefty-swinging backup catcher for the 1905–1907 Chicago White Sox; member of 1906 World Series champions
October 16 – Arch McDonald, 59, broadcaster for the Washington Senators from 1934 to 1956, interrupted by one year (1939) in New York as voice of Yankees and Giants
October 18 – Irish McIlveen, 80, Belfast-born pitcher/outfielder who appeared in 53 total games for the 1906 Pittsburgh Pirates and 1908–1909 New York Highlanders
October 21 – Oscar Tuero, 66, Cuban-born pitcher who made 58 appearances for the 1918–1920 St. Louis Cardinals; led 1919 National League hurlers in games pitched (45) and saves (4)
October 22 – Charlie Hartman, 72, pitcher for the 1908 Boston Red Sox

November
November 2 – Everett Scott, 67, shortstop, primarily for the Boston Red Sox (1914–1921) and New York Yankees (1922–1925), who played in 1,307 consecutive games from 1916 to 1925, a record later broken by Lou Gehrig; four-time World Series champion, three times as a member of the Red Sox
November 3 – Bobby Wallace, 86, Hall of Fame shortstop for the Cleveland Spiders (1894–1898), St. Louis Cardinals (1899–1901, 1917–1918) and St. Louis Browns (1902–1916) who set several fielding records; managed the Browns from 1911 to June 1, 1912, and Cincinnati Reds from September 14, 1937, through season's end; scouted for the Reds for 33 years
November 9 – Al Nixon, 74, outfielder for the Brooklyn Robins (1915–1916, 1918), Boston Braves (1921–1923) and Philadelphia Phillies (1926–1928), appearing in 422 career games 
November 11 – Red Causey, 67, "The Florida Flamingo", pitched in 131 games for the New York Giants, Boston Braves and Philadelphia Phillies from 1918 through 1922
November 12 – Merle Keagle, 37, All-Star female outfielder who set several single-season records in the AAGPBL
November 16 – Weldon Henley, 80, pitcher for the Philadelphia Athletics and Brooklyn Superbas from 1903 to 1907, pitched no-hitter on July 22, 1905 against the St. Louis Browns
November 20 – Frank Brower, 67, outfielder/first baseman who appeared in 340 games for the Washington Senators and Cleveland Indians from 1920 to 1924
November 24 – Abbie Johnson, 89, Canadian 19th-century infielder who appeared in 74 games for Louisville of the National League in 1896 and 1897

December
December 10 – Ernie Quigley, 80, National League umpire from 1913 to 1937 who worked in six World Series, was later a league supervisor
December 18 – Art Nehf, 68, pitcher who won 184 games for four National League teams, principally the New York Giants and Boston Braves
December 22 – Jack Onslow, 72, manager of the Chicago White Sox from 1949 through May 26, 1950; previously, catcher in 45 total games for 1912 Detroit Tigers and 1917 New York Giants, then a longtime coach and scout
December 26 – Fred Knorr, 47, Michigan-based broadcasting executive and co-owner of the Tigers from 1956 until his death